Ventsia is a genus of sea snails, marine gastropod mollusks, unassigned in the superfamily Seguenzioidea.

Species
Species within the genus Ventsia include:
 Ventsia hollanderi Fernández-Garcés, Rubio & Rolán, 2019
 Ventsia tricarinata Warén & Bouchet, 1993

References

 Warén, A. & Bouchet, P. (1993). New records, species, genera, and a new family of gastropods from hydrothermal vents and hydrocarbon seeps. Zoologica Scripta. 22: 1-90.

External links
 Kunze T., Heß M. & Haszprunar G. (2016). 3D-interactive microanatomy of Ventsia tricarinata Warén & Bouchet, 1993 (Vetigastropoda: Seguenzioidea) from Pacific hydrothermal vents. Journal of Molluscan Studies. 82(3): 366-377
 To GenBank 
 To World Register of Marine Species